Bhatodi is a small village in Ashti Subdivision in Beed district in the Indian state of Maharashtra. The Gram Panchayat has been established since 1992 as per 73rd Constitutional Amendment.  Its population according to the 2011 census was 512, with a literacy rate of 80%.

References
 

Villages in Beed district